Gunsmoke is an American western radio series, which was developed for radio by John Meston and Norman Macdonnell. The series ran for nine seasons and was broadcast by CBS.   The first episode of the series originally aired in the United States on April 26, 1952, and the final first-run episode aired on June 11, 1961.   During the series, a total of 480 original episodes were broadcast, including shows with re-used or adapted scripts. A television version of the series premiered in 1955.

Gunsmoke is set in and around Dodge City, Kansas, in the post-Civil War era and centers around United States Marshall Matt Dillon (William Conrad) as he enforces law and order in the city.  The series also focuses on Dillon's friendship with three other citizens of Dodge City: Doctor Charles "Doc" Adams (Howard McNear), the town's physician; Kitty Russell (Georgia Ellis), owner of the Long Branch Saloon; and Chester Wesley Proudfoot (Parley Baer), Dillon's deputy.  Other roles were played by a group of supporting actors consisting of John Dehner, Sam Edwards, Harry Bartell, Vic Perrin, Lou Krugman, Lawrence Dobkin, Barney Phillips, Jack Kruschen, Ralph Moody, Ben Wright, James Nusser, Richard Crenna, Tom Tully, Joseph Kearns, Virginia Gregg, Jeanette Nolan, Virginia Christine, Helen Kleeb, Lillian Buyeff, Vivi Janiss, and Jeanne Bates.  The entire nine-season run of Gunsmoke was produced by Norman Macdonnell.

Episodes
The original pilot episode of Gunsmoke was entitled "Mark Dillon Goes to Gouge Eye" and was recorded twice.  The first was on June 11, 1949, with Rye Billsbury as Dillon and the second on July 15, 1949, with Howard Culver in the lead.  Neither pilot was aired and the hero's name was eventually changed from Mark Dillon to Matt Dillon.

Season 1 (1952–1953)

Season 2 (1953–1954)

Season 3 (1954–1955)

Season 4 (1955–1956)

Season 5 (1956–1957)

Season 6 (1957–1958)

Season 7 (1958–1959)

Season 8 (1959–1960)

Season 9 (1960–1961)

See also 
 List of Gunsmoke (TV series) episodes

Footnotes

References 

 (runs to 480 episodes as it includes shows with re-used scripts)

External links 
 Episodes on Archive.org

Gunsmoke (radio series)
Gunsmoke